How Children Learn is a nonfiction book by educator John Caldwell Holt, first published in 1967. A revised edition was released in 1983, with new chapters and commentaries.

The book focuses on Holt's interactions with young children and his observations of children learning. From them, he attempts to make sense of how and why children do the things they do. The central thesis of his work is that children learn most effectively by their own motivation and on their own terms. He opposes teaching in general, believing that children find it just as patronizing as would an adult and that parents should provide information only as it is requested.

Children learn best when they are not pressured to learn in a way that is of no interest to them.

American non-fiction books
Books about education
1967 non-fiction books